The 2003 Alaska Aces season was the 18th season of the franchise in the Philippine Basketball Association (PBA).

Draft picks

Transactions

Occurrences
During the Invitational Cup, shooting guard Jon Ordonio was placed on the reserve list upon orders by the management. Ordonio was one of the five foreign-breed players whom the senate recommended for deportation upon investigation on the so-called Fil-Shams.

Championship
The Alaska Aces won the Invitational Championship for their 11th PBA title as they exact revenge over the Coca-Cola Tigers, the team that beat them for the All-Filipino crown last year. The Aces won the best-of-three title series, two games to one. Alaska was the sixth entry among PBA teams qualified to play in the second conference Invitationals that featured guest foreign teams. They were on a nine-game winning streak going into Game One of the final playoffs.

Roster

Game results

All-Filipino Cup

References

Alaska Aces (PBA) seasons
Alaska